The New Orleans mayoral election of 1962 resulted in the election of interim mayor Victor Schiro to his first full term as mayor of New Orleans.

Results 
First Democratic Party Primary, January 27, 1962

Second Democratic Party Primary, March 3, 1962

Sources 
 Orleans Parish Democratic Executive Committee. Mayoralty: First and Second Democratic Primary Elections, 1962.

Mayoral elections in New Orleans
New Orleans
1962 Louisiana elections